Piedmont, Virginia may refer to:

Piedmont, Augusta County, Virginia
Piedmont, Montgomery County, Virginia
Piedmont, Nelson County, Virginia
Piedmont region of Virginia
Piedmont, West Virginia, once a part of Virginia